is a western quarter of the city of Hamburg in Germany, it is subject to the district/borough Bezirk Altona and was an independent settlement until 1890. It is home to DESY and the Barclaycard Arena. In 2020 the population was 29,652.

History
The first records of Bahrenfeld dates 1256. In 1890 it was suburbanized into the city Altona. During Nazi Germany 1938 with the Greater Hamburg Act the city of Altona (including Bahrenfeld) was merged into Hamburg.

History section is based on a translation of the German article Bahrenfeld

Geography
Bahrenfeld is mixed of commercial and residential areas. Bahrenfeld is located south of Lurup and Eidelstedt, west of Stellingen and east of Osdorf. The southern boundaries to the quarters Othmarschen and Ottensen are the railway tracks of the city train. To the south west lies Groß Flottbek.

Politics
These are the results of the Hamburg state election:

Demographics
In 2006 in the quarter Bahrenfeld were living 26,434 people. In 1999 there were 14,230 households, out of which 16.8% had children under the age of 18 living with them and 52.3% of all households were made up of individuals. The average household size was 1.78.

Culture

Performing arts
In the neighbourhood Otto von Bahrenpark, a new created area at the location of an old gas plant, the Lichthof Theater is located in the street Mendelssohnstr. 16. It is a private theatre founded 1994 operating as a registered voluntary association. In August 2000 the theatre moved to the location Mendelssohnstrasse to a new auditorium for about 100 spectators.

Cemeteries
Altona Main Cemetery, Altonaer Hauptfriedhof, is located at the Altona Volkspark. Beside a Jewish cemetery, a Mennonite cemetery there are several Lutheran cemeteries. All this is a relict of freedom of belief in the history of Altona.

Parks
Located in Bahrenfeld is the Altona Volkspark. A large recreation area (205 hectares) established 1920.

The smaller Bonnepark is located between the Bundesautobahn 7, Bundesstraße 431 and a local road.

Sports
The Trabrennbahn Bahrenfeld is a harness racing arena.  Founded 1874 it is also a location for music concerts, e.g. it was one of the locations for the Bridges to Babylon Tour in 1998. In the northern part of the Altonaer Volkspark is the Barclaycard Arena, former home of the Hamburg Freezers, and one of the two homes of the Handball Hamburg club. The nearby Volksparkstadion  is home to the football section of the Hamburger SV club. Another club is the Bahrenfelder SV.

Education
There were 4 elementary schools and 2 secondary schools in the quarter and 30 physicians in private practice and 5 pharmacies. Parts of the world known Hamburg site of the research center DESY for particle physics, founded 1959, are located in the quarter.

Transportation
Bahrenfeld is serviced by the rapid transit system of the city or suburban railway with the Bahrenfeld station and the Diebsteich station.

According to the Department of Motor Vehicles (Kraftfahrt-Bundesamt), in the quarter were 8,942 private cars registered (337 cars/1000 people).

In Bahrenfeld is the exit Hamburg-Bahrenfeld of the Bundesautobahn 7/E 45. At this point the Bundesstrasse 431 is crossing the motorway, connecting Altona with Meldorf in Schleswig-Holstein.

Notes

Literature
 Martin Wendt, Wie Bahrenfeld wurde. Von der Steinzeit bis heute - die Chronik eines Hamburger Stadtteils., in: 750 Jahre Bahrenfeld, Hamburg 2006 (Festschrift, hg. v. Bürgerverein Bahrenfeld) 
 Johanna Wolff, Spaziergänge durch Bahrenfeld. Hamburg 1990 (Ergebnisse)

External links

Statistical office Hamburg and Schleswig-Holstein Statistisches Amt für Hamburg und Schleswig-Holstein, official website 
Lichthof theatre website 

Quarters of Hamburg
Altona, Hamburg